Kim Heon-jong (born 25 February 1942) is a South Korean rower. He competed in the men's eight event at the 1964 Summer Olympics.

References

1942 births
Living people
South Korean male rowers
Olympic rowers of South Korea
Rowers at the 1964 Summer Olympics
Place of birth missing (living people)